Green Street or similar terms may refer to:

Streets
 Green Street, Cambridge, United Kingdom
 Green Street, Newham, East London
 Green Street, Mayfair, West End of London
 Little Green Street, Kentish Town, North London
 Green Street, New London, Connecticut, USA

Buildings and structures
 Green Street (MBTA station), Boston, United States
 GreenStreet, a shopping mall and commercial development in Houston, Texas
 Green Street bunker, a fort built by the Australian air force in Queensland in World War II
 Green Street Courthouse, a former courthouse in Dublin, Ireland

Entertainment
 Green Street (film), a 2005 independent drama film about football hooliganism in England 
 Green Street 2: Stand Your Ground, a 2009 crime drama film
 Green Street 3: Never Back Down, a 2013 action drama film
 Green Street (album), a 1961 jazz album by Grant Green

Other uses
 Greenstreet, a surname (includes a list of people surnamed Greenstreet) 
 Greenstreet Software

See also 
 Green Dolphin Street (disambiguation)